Mochokiella paynei is the only species of catfish (order Siluriformes) in the genus Mochokiella of the family Mochokidae. This species is only known from the type locality, the Kassawe Forest Reserve in Sierra Leone. This oviparous fish grows to  SL.

References

Mochokidae
Endemic fauna of Sierra Leone
Fish described in 1980